Nakore Mosque is a mosque built in the Sudanese architectural style in the village of Nakore, southwest of Wa in the Upper West region of Ghana. It is a small mosque.

History 
According to historians, it was built in the earliest 17th century, when the Mande warriors followed the old Songhai trade routes south into what is currently Ghana. Islam took root as they settled around these north–south routes from Bobo-Diouslasso through Wa to Kumasi.

Features 
It is made of timber-frame structures that support the flat roof which is of mud construction. Timbers were reinforced to protrude externally and were used as scaffolding during plastering and construction. It also has a series irregularly shaped buttresses with pinnacles projecting which is above the parapet. It also has two towers that stand taller than the buttresses. One of these towers face east and contains a small prayer room. The entrances have triangular recesses which are above.

References 

Mosques in Ghana
17th-century mosques
Upper West Region
17th-century establishments in Africa
Sudano-Sahelian architecture